Rowbotham is a surname. Etymologically it is roe–bottom, meaning a depression in the ground (Old English bothm) inhabited by deer (roe). The name originates from such a geographic feature near Ashton-under-Lyne, England. Notable people with the surname include:

 Darran Rowbotham (born 1966), Welsh footballer
 David Rowbotham (1924–2010), Australian poet and journalist
 Dave Rowbotham (1958–1991), English rock musician
 Harry Rowbotham (1911–1979), English footballer 
 Jason Rowbotham (born 1969), Welsh footballer 
 Jeffrey Rowbotham (1920-1984), Scottish architect 
 Joseph Rowbotham (1831–1899), English cricketer
 Michael Rowbotham, political and economic writer and commentator 
 Mike Rowbotham (born 1965), South African footballer 
 Samuel Rowbotham (1816–1884), English inventor and writer, advocate for a flat earth
Sara Rowbotham, British councillor and activist
 Sheila Rowbotham (born 1943), British socialist feminist theorist
 Thomas Charles Leeson Rowbotham (1823–1875), British painter
 Thomas Leeson Scrase Rowbotham (1782–1853), British painter
 William John Owen Rowbotham, birth name of Bill Owen (1914–1999), British actor

Variant forms
 Rowbottom

Robottom
 Dame Marlene Robottom, British educator

Robotham
 George Robotham (1921–2007), American actor
 Michael Robotham (born 1960), Australian crime author
 Robert Robotham (c. 1522 – c. 1571), English politician
 William Arthur Robotham (Roy) British engineer with Rolls-Royce, designer of the Rolls-Royce Meteor tank engine

External links
 Rowbotham at House of Names



English toponymic surnames
English-language surnames